Richard McCarthy is a food systems leader, who devotes most of his energies to the relations between urban and rural communities. He is the co-founder of the Crescent City Farmers Market and its parent organization, Market Umbrella. For eighteen-years, he served as executive director, before taking the helm of Slow Food USA for six-years. There, he brought a sense of playfulness back to the organization with his signature refrain of "joy with justice." He continues to work with Slow Food International and serves on its executive committee. A longtime advocate for urban-rural linkages, he co-founded voice for farmers markets in the USA, the Farmers Market Coalition; and the World Farmers Market Coalition together with the United Nations Food and Agriculture Organization, and notable Italian farmers market network, Campagna Amica.

In 2021, McCarthy wrote a long overdue essay for the Farmers Market Coalition to provide historical and theoretical context for the USDA nutrition incentives program, GusNIP (so named for its tireless promoter, Gus Schumacher, former UnderSecretary for USDA). Recognizing the importance to mitigate risk for individuals to entertain behavior changes, the roots of this breakthrough poverty alleviation program can be found in conditional cash transfer initiatives in the global South. His paper, The Origins of Incentives, can be found on the Farmers Market Coalition website.

In 2020, McCarthy joined other leaders in the public market field, most notably the HealthBridge Foundation of Canada and New York City's Project for Public Spaces, to promote an ecosystems approach to public markets: Market Cities. The team presented these ideas, complete with seven-indicators of cities that function as one market system (even if no central authority is present), at the World Urban Forum 10 in Abu Dhabi, UAE.

In 2019, McCarthy began working with New Orleans folklorist and filmmaker, Kevin J. McCaffrey, to produce a short film, Lunch Money, with legendary Mississippi farmer and agricultural cooperative specialist, Ben Burkett, that makes a case for a Marshall Plan for Rural America, in order to address the public policy abandonment of rural communities. Inspired by visionary restaurateur and activist, Alice Waters, he embraces her concept of School Supported Agriculture, based upon the popular Community Supported Agriculture, as the context for reinvesting in rural with the kind of energy last seen in 1947's Marshall Plan to rebuild Europe after World War II.

In 2018, McCarthy began working with visionary Japanese rural development specialist, Tsuyoshi Sekihara, whose inventive work to link largely-forgotten rice-growing communities with urban dwellers who crave community and connection is largely unknown outside of Japan. The two were introduced by the Japan Society and the NPO Center of Japan. Sekihara calls this approach, Kuni (reimagining the ancient term for nation, based on the 8th century capitol of Japan, Kuni-kyo. Their book, Kuni, was published by North Atlantic Books and distributed by Penguin Random House in 2022.

In 2017, McCarthy launched Slow Food Nations in Denver, CO, together with partners in philanthropy, the food movement, and the City of Denver, as a public-facing festival to bring the food movement back to the interior of North America. For three-years, this ambitious festival attracted 25,000 participants from around the region, nation, and beyond. A key element was participation from farmers and traditional cooks who work with Slow Food Mexico, and the leaders of the First Nations' Slow Food Turtle Island.

In 2016, McCarthy debated former White House chef, Sam Kass, at the James Beard Foundation Food Conference in New York City. The question at hand: "The Unraveling of the Industrial Food System Must Be a Key Goal of a Lasting Food Movement." The full debate can be viewed on The Foundation's FaceBook page. The transcript of McCarthy's remarks can be read here.

In 2012, McCarthy was named a "Hero of the New South" by Southern Living magazine.  He is a graduate of the London School of Economics. A small selection of McCarthy's personal papers are archived at Loyola University New Orleans.

In 2010, McCarthy joined other local activists and community leaders to present a TEDx Talk on the fifth anniversary of Hurricane Katrina. His organization, Market Umbrella, played a pivotal role in restarting normalcy, and rebuilding the regional food system in the wake of the "natural" disaster.

An author and activist, McCarthy works as a consultant at the hyper-global and local level for social enterprises, philanthropy and organizations that align with his desire to defend small places, promote animal welfare, and cultivate the ecology of local economies. You can find recent work on his website, Think Like Pirates.

References

External links
New Orleans Social Justice and Activism 1980s-1990s Finding Aid at Loyola University New Orleans; contains Richard McCarthy Papers, 1989-1999
Think Like Pirates is where you can find Richard McCarthy's blogpost, and links to writings, speeches and short films. 
World Farmers Market Coalition
Market Cities Initiative
Slow Food International
Market Umbrella

Living people
Sustainability advocates
Alumni of the London School of Economics
Year of birth missing (living people)